Antonis Koniaris (alternate spelling: Antonios) (born September 30, 1997) is a Greek professional basketball player for AEK Athens of the Greek Basket League and the Basketball Champions League. He is a 1.93 m (6'4") tall point guard.

Early career
Koniaris began playing youth basketball during primary school, in 2006, after joining a local team in Akrotiri, Chania.

Professional career
Koniaris began his pro career in 2013, after he signed with the Greek League club PAOK. On 24 July 2014, Koniaris' agent, Tasos Delimpaltadakis, announced via Twitter, that Panathinaikos had signed a young point guard. Some hours after this, Panathinaikos announced the signing of Koniaris, for 5 years. As a member of Panathinaikos, Koniaris won two Greek Cups, in 2015 and 2016.

On August 19, 2016, he returned to PAOK, after signing a three-year contract with them. On June 30, 2019, Koniaris signed a three-year contract (two years guaranteed, plus one option year) with the Greek EuroLeague club Olympiacos.

On July 1, 2019, he has signed a 3-year deal with Olympiacos of the EuroLeague. During his rookie season in Piraeus, Koniaris appeared in 24 EuroLeague Regular Season games, averaging 3.4 points, 1.4 assists and 1.4 rebounds as the back-up point guard of the team, under the instructions of coach Kęstutis Kemzūra at first and later of club's legend Georgios Bartzokas. 

On January 16, 2021, after playing only friendly games and struggling for minutes with the Reds in the EuroLeague rotation, he went on loan to Monbus Obradoiro of the Liga ACB. On March 1, 2021, Koniaris left the Spanish club after a short spell of just 3 games in the Liga ACB. On March 5 of the same year, he returned to the Greek Basket League for Ionikos Nikaias, once again on loan from Olympiacos, until the end of the 2020-21 season.

On December 30, 2021, Koniaris, having recovered from a serious ACL injury, officially signed with AEK Athens through the summer of 2024. In 7 league games, he averaged 2.3 points, 0.9 rebounds, 0.7 assists and 0.6 steals in under 10 minutes per contest.

National team career

Greek junior national team
With the junior national teams of Greece, Koniaris won the gold medal at the 2013 TBF Under-16 World Cup in Sakarya, Turkey, where he helped Greece win the gold medal. He was named to the tournament's All-Tournament Team, and was also named the MVP of the tournament. He also won the bronze medal at the 2013 FIBA Europe Under-16 Championship.

He also played at the 2014 FIBA Europe Under-18 Championship, and at the 2014 FIBA Under-17 World Cup. He was selected by head coach Ilias Papatheodorou to play at the 2015 FIBA Under-19 World Cup, but he was suffering from OCD in his right ankle, which ruled him out. He also played at the 2016 FIBA Europe Under-20 Championship Division B, where he won a bronze medal.

He also played at the 2017 FIBA Europe Under-20 Championship, where he won a gold medal, and was voted to the All-Tournament Team.

Greek senior national team
Koniaris has also been a member of the senior Greek national basketball team. He played at the 2019 FIBA World Cup qualification.

Awards and accomplishments

Club career
2× Greek Cup Winner: (2015, 2016)
2× Greek League Best Young Player: (2017, 2018)
Greek League All Star: (2018)
Greek All Star Game 3 Point Shootout Champion: (2018)
Greek Youth All Star Game 3 Point Shootout Champion: (2018)

Greek junior national team
2013 TBF Under-16 World Cup: 
2013 TBF Under-16 World Cup: All-Tournament Team
2013 TBF Under-16 World Cup: MVP
2013 FIBA Europe Under-16 Championship: 
2016 FIBA Europe Under-20 Championship Division B: 
2017 FIBA Europe Under-20 Championship: 
2017 FIBA Europe Under-20 Championship: All-Tournament Team

References

External links
Euroleague.net profile
FIBA profile
FIBA Europe profile
Eurobasket.com profile
Greek Basket League profile 
Greek Basket League profile 
Draftexpress.com profile

1997 births
AEK B.C. players
Living people
Greek men's basketball players
Ionikos Nikaias B.C. players
Liga ACB players
Obradoiro CAB players
Olympiacos B.C. players
Panathinaikos B.C. players
P.A.O.K. BC players
Point guards
Basketball players from Chania